Lewis Martin may refer to:
Lewis J. Martin (1844–1913), U.S. Representative from New Jersey
Lewis Martin (actor) (1895–1974), American actor
Lewis Martin (Australian politician) (1872–1944), member of the New South Wales Legislative Assembly
Lewis Martin (footballer) (born 1996), Scottish footballer for Dunfermline Athletic

See also
Louis Martin (disambiguation)